In mathematical logic, a formula of first-order logic is in Skolem normal form if it is in prenex normal form with only universal first-order quantifiers. 

Every first-order formula may be converted into Skolem normal form while not changing its satisfiability via a process called Skolemization (sometimes spelled Skolemnization). The resulting formula is not necessarily equivalent to the original one, but is equisatisfiable with it: it is satisfiable if and only if the original one is satisfiable.

Reduction to Skolem normal form is a method for removing existential quantifiers from formal logic statements, often performed as the first step in an automated theorem prover.

Examples 

The simplest form of Skolemization is for existentially quantified variables that are not inside the scope of a universal quantifier. These may be replaced simply by creating new constants.

More generally, Skolemization is performed by replacing every existentially quantified variable  with a term  whose function symbol  is new. The variables of this term are as follows. In general, they are the variables that are quantified universally (we assume we get rid of existential quantifiers in order, so all existential quantifiers before  have been removed) and such that  occurs in the scope of their quantifiers. The function  introduced in this process is called a Skolem function (or Skolem constant if it is of zero arity) and the term is called a Skolem term.
 
As an example, the formula  is not in Skolem normal form because it contains the existential quantifier . The formula obtained by this transformation is satisfiable if and only if the original formula is.

How Skolemization works

Skolemization works by applying a second-order equivalence together with the definition of first-order satisfiability. The equivalence provides a way for "moving" an existential quantifier before a universal one. 

where

Intuitively, the sentence "for every  there exists a  such that " is converted into the equivalent form "there exists a function  mapping every  into a  such that, for every  it holds ".

This equivalence is useful because the definition of first-order satisfiability implicitly existentially quantifies over the evaluation of function symbols. In particular, a first-order formula  is satisfiable if there exists a model  and an evaluation  of the free variables of the formula that evaluate the formula to true. The model contains the evaluation of all function symbols; therefore, Skolem functions are implicitly existentially quantified.

As a result, after replacing existential quantifiers over variables by existential quantifiers over functions at the front of the formula, the formula still may be treated as a first-order one by removing these existential quantifiers.

Correctness of Skolemization may be shown on the example formula  as follows. By the axiom of choice, there exists a function  such that . This shows that  is satisfiable only if  is satisfiable as well.

Uses of Skolemization
One of the uses of Skolemization is automated theorem proving. For example, in the method of analytic tableaux, whenever a formula whose leading quantifier is existential occurs, the formula obtained by removing that quantifier via Skolemization may be generated.

This form of Skolemization is an improvement over "classical" Skolemization in that only variables that are free in the formula are placed in the Skolem term. This is an improvement because the semantics of tableaux may implicitly place the formula in the scope of some universally quantified variables that are not in the formula itself; these variables are not in the Skolem term, while they would be there according to the original definition of Skolemization. Another improvement that may be used is applying the same Skolem function symbol for formulae that are identical up to variable renaming.

Another use is in the resolution method for first-order logic, where formulas are represented as sets of clauses understood to be universally quantified. (For an example see drinker paradox.)

An important result in model theory is the Lowenheim-Skolem theorem, which can be proven via Skolemizing the theory and closing under the resulting Skolem functions.

Skolem theories

Every Skolem theory is model complete, i.e. every substructure of a model is an elementary substructure. Given a model M of a Skolem theory T, the smallest substructure containing a certain set A is called the Skolem hull of A. The Skolem hull of A is an atomic prime model over A.

History 
Skolem normal form is named after the late Norwegian mathematician Thoralf Skolem.

See also
 Herbrandization, the dual of Skolemization 
 Predicate functor logic

Notes

References

External links
 
 Skolemization on PlanetMath.org
 Skolemization by Hector Zenil, The Wolfram Demonstrations Project.
 

Normal forms (logic)
Model theory